Prabhācandra (c. 11th century CE) was a Digambara monk,grammarian,biographer, philosopher and author of several philosophical books on Jainism.

Life
Prabhachandra was a Digambara monk who flourished in 11th century CE. He denied the possibility of any genuine intensity of action, whether good or bad, on the part of women.

According to him, Kumarapala converted to Jainism and started worshipping Ajitanatha after conquering Ajmer.

Works
Nyāyakumudacandra : A commentary on Akalanka's work Laghīyastraya.
Prameyakamalamārtaṇḍa : A commentary on Manikyanandi's work Pariksamukha.
Tattvārtha-vṛtti-pada-vivaraṇa : A commentary on Pūjyapāda’s work Sarvārtha-siddhi.
Śabdāmbhoja-bhāskara-vṛtti : A commentary on Pūjyapāda’s work Jainendra-Vyākaraṇa.
Pravacanasāra-saroja-bhāskara : A commentary on Āchārya Kundakunda’s Pravachanasara. It was translated in Hindi by Muni Pranamyasagar 
Śākatāyana-nyāsa.
 Prabhavaka Charita (IAST: Prabhavakacarita): Biographies of Jain monks

Notes

References
 
 
 
 
 

11th-century writers
Digambara
Indian Jain writers
Indian Jain monks
11th-century Indian Jains
11th-century Jain monks
11th-century Indian monks